This is a list of Japanese Brazilians, that is, notable people of Japanese ancestry born or raised in Brazil. Japanese immigration to Brazil started in 1908 with the arrival of the Kasato Maru.

See also
 Foreign-born Japanese
 List of Japanese people
 List of Brazilians

References

Brazilians
Japanese
Japanese